Saša Nikodijević (born 16 July 1987) is a Serbian football defender.

He is the brother of Slađan Nikodijević.

References

External links
 
 Saša Nikodijević Stats at utakmica.rs

1987 births
Living people
Footballers from Paris
Association football defenders
Serbian footballers
FK Jagodina players
FK Jedinstvo Užice players
FK Metalac Gornji Milanovac players
Serbian SuperLiga players
French people of Serbian descent
FK Krupa players